Sekine is a Japanese surname. Notable people with the surname include:

Akiko Sekine, athlete
Akira Sekine, Japanese voice actress
Kazumi Sekine, film director 
Keiko Sekine, maiden name of actress Keiko Takahashi
, Japanese sculptor
Shinobu Sekine (1943–2018), judoka
Thomas T. Sekine, economist
Shiori Sekine, bassist for the Japanese indie band, Base Ball Bear
Tsutomu Sekine, Japanese comedian and television presenter

See also 
9960 Sekine, a main-belt asteroid
Sekine Station, a railway station in Yonezawa

Japanese-language surnames

de:Sekine